Ganeung Station is a metro station on the Seoul Subway Line 1, located in northern Uijeongbu, South Korea. It was also the northern terminus for Seoul Subway Line 1 until the line was extended to Soyosan.

History
It was originally built as a traditional railway station in 1961, named Gareung Station, but was abolished in 1963. It was rebuilt as Uijeongbu Bukbu Station and then renamed Ganeung in 2006.

Platforms
 Platform 1: to Kwangwoon University / Guro / Incheon
 Platform 2: to Soyosan / Dongducheon / Yangju

Exits
 Exit 1: Ganeung 1-dong Office, Korean National Red Cross, Uijeongbu Girls' High School, Uijeongbu Girls' Middle School, Uijeongbu Technical High School, Korea Electric Power Corporation
 Exit 2: Baeyoung Elementary School, Uijeongbu Joongang Elementary School, Uijeongbu 1-dong Post Office
 Exit 3: Parking lot

References 

Seoul Metropolitan Subway stations
Metro stations in Uijeongbu
Railway stations opened in 1987